Etna (formerly Miller's Settlement and Columbia, sometimes referred to as Aetna) is an unincorporated community in Tompkins County, New York, United States. It lies at an elevation of 1020 feet (311 m).

References

Hamlets in Tompkins County, New York